Miguel Ángel Martínez (born January 19, 1984) is a retired Argentine football defender. Martínez also holds Mexican citizenship.

Background

Martínez spent some time in the youth squads of Racing Club of his native Argentina and Atletico de Madrid in Spain, before moving to Mexico in 2008 to play for Club León for the Apertura 2008.

For the Clausura 2009 tournament, he was traded to Atlante F.C. He was given the #2 shirt, vacated by his compatriot Javier Muñoz, who left to CF Pachuca.

On 9 May 2019 it was confirmed, that Martínez had retired from football.

Honours

Club
Querétaro
Copa MX: Apertura 2016
Supercopa MX: 2017

References

External links
 
 
 

1984 births
Living people
Sportspeople from Buenos Aires Province
Argentine footballers
Argentine expatriate footballers
Liga MX players
Ascenso MX players
Argentine Primera División players
Club Atlético Belgrano footballers
Atlante F.C. footballers
Club León footballers
Chiapas F.C. footballers
Querétaro F.C. footballers
Expatriate footballers in Mexico
Association football defenders
Naturalized citizens of Mexico